Sahibzada Muhammad Gazain Abbasi is a Pakistani politician who had been a member of the Provincial Assembly of the Punjab from August 2018 till January 2023.

Early life
He was born on 21 February 1982.

Political career
He was elected to the Provincial Assembly of the Punjab as an independent candidate from Constituency PP-268 (Bahawalpur-II) in 2008 Pakistani general election. He received 24,822 votes and defeated an independent candidate, Rafat ur Rehman Rehmani. In the same election, he also ran for the seat of the National Assembly of Pakistan as an independent candidate from Constituency NA-184 (Bahawalpur-II) but was unsuccessful. He received 6,974 votes and lost the seat to an independent candidate, Malik Amir Yar Waran.

He was re-elected to the Provincial Assembly of the Punjab as a candidate of Pakistan Tehreek-e-Insaf from Constituency PP-253 (Bahawalpur-IX) in 2018 Pakistani general election.

References

Living people
1982 births
Punjab MPAs 2008–2013
Punjab MPAs 2018–2023
Pakistan People's Party MPAs (Punjab)
Pakistan Tehreek-e-Insaf MPAs (Punjab)
Bahawalpur royal family